Tones is the first studio album by guitarist Eric Johnson, released in 1986 through Reprise Records; a remastered edition was reissued on February 23, 2010 through Wounded Bird Records. Both "Zap" and "Emerald Eyes" are re-recordings from Johnson's then-unreleased 1978 debut album Seven Worlds, which eventually saw an official release in 1998. The instrumental "Zap", released as a B-side to the single "Off My Mind", was nominated for Best Rock Instrumental Performance at the 1987 Grammy Awards.

Critical reception

Daniel Gioffre at AllMusic gave Tones four stars out of five, calling it "an exceptionally strong debut" and "a beautiful and important album by one of the greatest electric guitarists ever to pick up the instrument." He also noted "Trail of Tears" and "Bristol Shore" as highlights.

Track listing

Personnel
 Eric Johnson – guitar, lead vocals, keyboard
 Stephen Barber – Fairlight CMI, piano
 David Tickle – Fairlight CMI, programming, percussion, producer, engineer
 Roscoe Beck – bass guitar
 Tommy Taylor – drums, percussion, backing vocals
 Jerry Marotta – percussion, backing vocals
 Jennifer Warnes – backing vocals

Awards

References

External links
In Review: Eric Johnson "Tones" at Guitar Nine Records

Eric Johnson albums
1986 albums
Reprise Records albums
Grammy Award for Best Rock Instrumental Performance
Albums produced by David Tickle